James Weldon Demmel Jr. (born October 19, 1955) is an American mathematician and computer scientist, the Dr. Richard Carl Dehmel Distinguished Professor of Mathematics and Computer Science at the University of California, Berkeley.

In 1999, Demmel was elected a member of the National Academy of Engineering for contributions to numerical linear algebra and scientific computing.

Biography
Born in Pittsburgh, Demmel did his undergraduate studies at the California Institute of Technology, graduating in 1975 with a B.S. in mathematics. He earned his Ph.D. in computer science in 1983 from UC Berkeley, under the supervision of William Kahan; his dissertation was entitled A Numerical Analyst's Jordan Canonical Form. After holding a faculty position at New York University for six years, he moved to Berkeley in 1990.

Academic Works
Demmel is known for his work on LAPACK, a software library for numerical linear algebra and more generally for research in numerical algorithms combining mathematical rigor with high performance implementation. Prometheus, a parallel multigrid finite element solver written by Demmel, Mark Adams, and Robert Taylor, won the Carl Benz Award at Supercomputing 1999 and the Gordon Bell Prize for Adams and his coworkers at Supercomputing 2004.

Honors and awards
Demmel was elected as a member of the National Academy of Engineering in 1999, a fellow of the Association for Computing Machinery in 1999, a fellow of the IEEE in 2001, a fellow of SIAM in 2009, and a member of the United States National Academy of Sciences in 2011. Demmel was one of two scientists honored in 1986 with the Leslie Fox Prize for Numerical Analysis. In 1993, Demmel won the J.H. Wilkinson Prize in Numerical Analysis and Scientific Computing, and in 2010, he was the winner of the IEEE's Sidney Fernbach Award "for computational science leadership in creating adaptive, innovative, high-performance linear algebra software". In 2012 he became a fellow of the American Mathematical Society. He received the IEEE Computer Society Charles Babbage Award in 2013.

Personal life
Demmel is married to Katherine Yelick, who is also an ACM Fellow and professor of electrical engineering and computer science at UC Berkeley, and Associate Lab Director for Computing Sciences at Lawrence Berkeley National Laboratory.

References

External links

Home page at UC Berkeley

Living people
20th-century American mathematicians
21st-century American mathematicians
American computer scientists
Numerical analysts
California Institute of Technology alumni
University of California, Berkeley alumni
New York University faculty
Fellows of the Association for Computing Machinery
Fellows of the American Mathematical Society
Fellow Members of the IEEE
Members of the United States National Academy of Sciences
Members of the United States National Academy of Engineering
UC Berkeley College of Engineering faculty
1955 births
People from Pittsburgh